Keamogetse Wolff (born 19 August 1988) is a South African football (soccer) defender who plays for Premier Soccer League club Bloemfontein Celtic. Wolff is known for his agility and anaerobic endurance.

Club career 

He began his career in Bloemfontein Celtic in 2006 and continued to play for the team till 2009. He has played in various positions over the past 8 years including left wing, left back and defensive midfield.

References

1988 births
South African soccer players
Living people
Association football defenders
Sportspeople from Bloemfontein
Bidvest Wits F.C. players
Jomo Cosmos F.C. players
Cape Town Spurs F.C. players
Bloemfontein Celtic F.C. players
Chippa United F.C. players
Soccer players from the Free State (province)